Hussain Al-Eisa (born 29 December 2000) is a Saudi professional footballer who plays as a winger for Pro League club Al-Wehda.

Career

Al-Adalah
Al-Eisa started his career with Al-Adalah where he was promoted from the youth team to the first team. He signed his first professional contract with the club on 24 June 2018. Al-Eisa helped Al-Adalah reach the Pro League, the top tier of Saudi football, for the first time in the club's history. On 11 June 2019, Al-Eisa renewed his contract with Al-Adalah following their promotion to the Pro League.

Al-Wehda
On 27 September 2020, Al-Eisa left Al-Adalah and joined Al-Wehda.

Al-Batin
Following Al-Wehda's relegation to the MS League, Al-Eisa joined Al-Batin on loan until the end of the 2021–22 season.

Career statistics

Club

Honours

International
Saudi Arabia U23
AFC U-23 Asian Cup: 2022

References

External links 
 

2000 births
Living people
People from Al-Hasa
Association football wingers
Saudi Arabian footballers
Saudi Arabia youth international footballers
Al-Adalah FC players
Al-Wehda Club (Mecca) players
Al Batin FC players
Saudi Second Division players
Saudi First Division League players
Saudi Professional League players
Saudi Arabian Shia Muslims